Procyanidin B8 is a B type proanthocyanidin.

Procyanidin B8 is a catechin-(4α→6)-epicatechin dimer. It can be found in grape seeds and in beer.

References 

Procyanidin dimers